Foos is a surname. Notable people with the surname include:

Dominic Foos (born 1997), German golfer
Gerald Foos, American hotelier
Reva Foos (born 1993), German swimmer
Richard Foos, American business owner
Ron Foos, American bassist